Germán Reyes (born 20 November 1902, date of death unknown) was a Chilean footballer. He played in three matches for the Chile national football team in 1924. He was also part of Chile's squad for the 1924 South American Championship, and for the 1928 Summer Olympics, but he did not play in any matches in the latter.

References

External links
 

1902 births
Year of death missing
Chilean footballers
Chile international footballers
Place of birth missing
Association football midfielders
Colo-Colo footballers